Baba Buddha (Gurmukhi: ਬਾਬਾ ਬੁੱਢਾ; bābā buḍhā; lit. meaning "wise old man") (6 October 1506 – 8 September 1631) was a prime figure in early Sikhism. He was born in 1506 in the village of Kathu Nangal, in Amritsar . His father's name was Sugha Randhawa and his mother was named Mai Gauran. His birth name was Bura (Gurmukhi: ਬੂੜਾ; būṛā). As a child, while grazing cattle outside his village, he met Guru Nanak. He asked Guru Nanak many questions regarding life and death, such that, at his young age, Guru Nanak blessed him with the name Buddha, as he spoke as if he were a wise elder. He was one of the earliest Sikhs of Guru Nanak, and performed the formal coronation ceremonies of the five Sikh gurus who succeeded Guru Nanak; Guru Angad, Guru Amar Das, Guru Ram Das, Guru Arjan, and Guru Hargobind. 

On installation of the Adi Granth, a compilation of Sikh scripture, at Sri Harimandir Sahib on August 16th, 1604, Bhai Buddha was appointed the first Granthi by Guru Arjan.

On May 30th, 1606 after the martyrdom of Guru Arjun, Guru Hargobind ordered the construction of the Akal Takht and entrusted the responsibility of its construction to Baba Buddha and Bhai Gurdas. While Guru Hargobind was in jail, Baba Budha reformed the Nihang army, at the time called the Akal Sena, although now it is named the Budha Dal after Jathedar Baba Budha Randhawa.

After a lifetime of following the Sikh Gurus, Baba Buddha died at the age of 124 years in 1631 at the village of Jhanda Ramdas, on the banks of the Ravi River. Guru Hargobind was at his bedside and honoured him by carrying him to his funeral pyre and reciting passages from the Adi Granth.

Gallery

See also 

 Bhai Gurdas
 Bhai Mani Singh
 Baba Deep Singh
 Gurgaddi

References

 gurbilas Chhevin Patshahi. Patiala, 1970
 Bhalla, Sarup Das, Mahima Prakash. Patiala, 1971
 Padam, Piara Singh, and Gianl Garja Singh, eds., Guru ban Sakhlari Patiala, 1986

Further reading

Indian Sikhs
Spiritual teachers
1631 deaths
History of Sikhism
Longevity myths